Lola Akande is a Nigerian academic and fiction writer. She has published four novels, including the award-winning What It Takes, and her latest book, Suitors Are Scarce In Lagos.

Life and career 
Akande was born on 3 October 1965 in Kwara state, Nigeria. She teaches African literature in the Department of English, Faculty of Arts, University of Lagos.
Her first novel, In Our Place, was published in 2012 by Macmillan Nigeria Publishers Limited, which was subsequently followed by What It Takes, which was published in 2016.
In 2020, she published a short story collection, which was nominated for the ANA Prize in 2022.

Published works
Lola Akande has published three works of fiction, a monograph and several academic publications.

Novels
 Akande, Lola. 2018. Where Are You From? Ibadan: Kraft Books Limited. 
 Akande, Lola. 2016. What It Takes Ibadan: Kraft Books Limited. 
 Akande, Lola. 2012. In Our Place Ibadan: Macmillan Nigeria Publishers Limited

Short stories

 Akande, Lola. 2019 "I Fixed It" published in the anthology: Sisi Eko. Lagos: Farafina
 Akande, Lola. 2013 "Camouflage" published in the anthology: Dream Chasers. Ibadan: Nelson Fiction

Monograph

Akande, Lola. (2019) The City in the African Novel - A Thematic Rendering of Urban Spaces. Lagos: Tunmike Pages

Awards
Her work, What It Takes in 2017 earned her the Association of Nigerian Authors (ANA) Prize for Prose Fiction.

References

1965 births
Living people
Nigerian novelists